The Mamu is a tributary of the river Olt in Romania. It joins the Olt through the Oporelu Canal, into which it flows in Colibași.

References

Rivers of Olt County
Rivers of Vâlcea County
Rivers of Romania